The 2002 Stella Artois Championships was a men's tennis tournament played on grass courts at the Queen's Club in London in the United Kingdom and was part of the International Series of the 2002 ATP Tour. It was the 100th edition of the tournament and was held from 10 June through 16 June 2002. First-seeded Lleyton Hewitt won his third consecutive singles title at the event.

Finals

Singles

 Lleyton Hewitt defeated  Tim Henman 4–6, 6–1, 6–4
 It was Hewitt's 3rd title of the year and the 17th of his career.

Doubles

 Wayne Black /  Kevin Ullyett defeated  Mahesh Bhupathi /  Max Mirnyi 7–6(7–5), 3–6, 6–3
 It was Black's 3rd title of the year and the 10th of his career. It was Ullyett's 3rd title of the year and the 16th of his career.

References

External links
 Official website
 ATP tournament profile

 
Stella Artois Championships
Queen's Club Championships
Stella Artois Championships
Stella Artois Championships
Stella Artois Championships